First FM is a local radio station based in Oxford, England broadcasting to Oxford and the surrounding area. The station is licensed by Ofcom and broadcasts on 105.1 FM in Oxford and also online.

History

The station launched as "Destiny 105" on 14 February 2014, taking the place of the previously licensed station OX105 which had been found in breach by Ofcom for failing to provide the licensed service. The 105.1 FM Oxford license is held by OX4 FM Community Interest Company. Following the collapse of previous station OX105 in 2013, the 105.1 service was transferred to a new management team of experienced broadcasters who then faced the challenge of acquiring and building new studios at short notice.

Following this change of management the license was re-branded and the station re-launched initially as Destiny 105 on 14 February 2014 from new studios in East Oxford, with equipment and facilities provided by Broadcast Ltd. On 15 January 2018 the station re-branded with new on air identity "First FM".

Format
During the day, First 105.1 FM plays a mainstream cross genre selection of music, interspersed with news, information and other items relevant to the local community. During evenings, specialist shows cover a wide range of music and information of all types.

Technology
First 105.1 FM is notable in that the studios run almost entirely using open-source software, with Linux used extensively throughout the station.

References

Community radio stations in the United Kingdom
Mass media in Oxford
Mass media in Oxfordshire
2014 establishments in England
Radio stations established in 2014
Radio stations in Oxfordshire